Helena Maria Duailibe Ferreira (born December 30, 1958) is a Brazilian physician and politician. She was Health's secretary of Maranhão (2002–2007), vice-mayor (2009–2012) and councilwoman (2013–2014). Duailibe was also a Municipal Secretary of Health. She is married with Afonso Manoel.

References 

Brazilian Socialist Party politicians
Brazilian Democratic Movement politicians
Living people
1958 births